FSB (abbreviation for Formation Studio Balkanton) are a Bulgarian progressive rock band formed in 1975 in Sofia as a studio project. FSB achieved great success in the 1980s and performed in numerous countries across Europe. Their collaboration with singer Jose Feliciano resulted in the album I'm Never Gonna Change and a Grammy award in 1990.

Current members 
 Rumen Boyadzhiev — vocals, keyboards (1975–present)
 Konstantin Tsekov — keyboards, vocals (1975–present)
 Ivan Lechev — guitar (1979–present)

Former members 
 Aleksandar Baharov — bass (1975–1983)
 Peter Slavov — drums (1979–2006, d.2008)
 Ivaylo Kraychovski — bass (1983–2007, d.2018)

Discography

External links
 
 FSB at Bulgarian Rock Archives

Grammy Award winners
Bulgarian new wave musical groups
Bulgarian rock music groups
Bulgarian progressive rock groups
1975 establishments in Bulgaria
Musical groups established in 1975
Musical groups disestablished in 1996
Musical groups established in 2007
Culture in Sofia